Nepal SBI Bank Limited (NSBL) is the first Indo-Nepal joint venture in the financial sector sponsored by three institutional promoters, namely State Bank of India (SBI), Employees Provident Fund and Agricultural Development Bank of Nepal through a memorandum of understanding signed on 17 July 1992.

About 
NSBL was incorporated as Public Limited Company at the Office of the Company Registrar on 28 April 1993 under Regn. No. 17-049/50 with an Authorized Capital of Rs. 120 million and was licensed by Nepal Rastra Bank on 6 July 1993 under license No. NRB/l.Pa./7/2049/50. NSBL commenced operation with effect from 7 July 1993 with one full-fledged office at Durbar Marg, Kathmandu with 18 staff members. The staff strength has since increased to 910 as on Ashadh on NSBL working in 91 branches, 21 extension counters, 7 Provincial Offices, 9 branchless banking & a Corporate Office.

Under the Banks & Financial Institutions Act, 2063, Nepal Rastra Bank granted fresh license to NSBL classifying it as an "A" class licensed institution on 26 April 2006 under license No. NRB/I.Pra.Ka.7/062/63. The Authorized capital is Rs. 15000.0 million and Paid up Capital is Rs. 8956.2 million. The management team consists of managing director & CEO, Dy.CEO & Chief financial officer and chief operating officer from SBI (They are deputed by SBI for  management support as per the Technical Services Agreement)

State Bank of India (SBI) holds 55 percent of the total share capital of the Bank, 15 percent is held by the Employees Provident Fund and the balance is held by the general public.

In terms of the Technical Services Agreement between SBI and the NSBL, the former provides management support to the bank through its expatriate officers including managing director who is also the CEO of the Bank. Central Management Committee (CENMAC) consisting of the managing director & CEO, Dy. CEO & chief financial officer, chief operating officer and Chief Risk & Compliance Officer oversee the overall banking operations in the Bank.

State Bank of India (SBI), with a history of 214 years, is the largest commercial banks in India in terms of assets, deposits, profits, branches, customers and employees. The Government of India is the single largest shareholder of this Fortune 500 entity with 56.92% ownership.

The origins of State Bank of India date back to 1806 when the Bank of Calcutta (later called the Bank of Bengal) was established. In 1921, the Bank of Bengal and two other banks (Bank of Madras and Bank of Bombay) were amalgamated to form the Imperial Bank of India. In 1955, the Reserve Bank of India acquired the controlling interests of the Imperial Bank of India and SBI was created by an act of Parliament to succeed the Imperial Bank of India.

The SBI group, consists of SBI and its numerous Subsidiaries. The group has an extensive network, with over 22000 plus branches in India and another 227 offices in 30 countries across the world. As of 31 March 2020, the group had assets worth US$522.84 billion, deposits of US$428.93 billion and capital & reserves in excess of US$30.58 billion. The group commands over 22.84% share of deposit in Indian banking market.

SBI's non- banking subsidiaries / Joint ventures are market leaders in their respective areas and provide wide-ranging services, which include Life Insurance, General Insurance, Merchant Banking, Mutual Funds, Credit Cards, Factoring Services, Security Trading and Primary Dealership, making the SBI Group a truly large financial supermarket and India's financial icon. SBI has arrangements with various international / local banks to exchange financial messages through SWIFT in all business centers of the world to facilitate trade related banking business, reinforced by dedicated and highly skilled teams of professionals.

References 

Banks of Nepal
Banks established in 1993
Nepalese subsidiaries of foreign companies
1992 establishments in Nepal